Bangay Chak is a village in the Faisalabad District of Punjab, Pakistan. It is linked with the M3 motorway by the Sahianwala interchange and with the M4 motorway by Jarranwala interchange. Its population is primarily Punjabi and second largest village in Tehsil Jarranwala. Its major production crops are sugar cane, wheat and rice. Its primary religion is Islam; it has two mosques: Jamia Masjid Gulzar-e-Madina and Al rehman Masjid under Quran O Sunnah Society in village.

Villages in Faisalabad District